Rioux may refer to:

 Rioux, French commune in Charente-Maritime
 Rioux-Martin, French commune in Charente
 Christien Rioux, computer security specialist
 Erin Rioux, a NYC-based musician
 Geneviève Rioux (b. 1961), Canadian actress
 Gerry Rioux (b. 1959), Canadian hockey player
 Jean-Antoine Rioux (1925-2017), French parasitologist
 Johnny Rioux (b. 1974), American musician
 Laurent Rioux, Canadian NASCAR driver
 Pierre Rioux (b. 1962), Canadian hockey player